James Collier (1872–1933) was a U.S. Representative from Mississippi.

James Collier may also refer to:

 James Collier (cashier), Chief Cashier of the Bank of England (1739–1751)
 James D. Y. Collier (born 1958), microelectronics engineer
 James Lincoln Collier (born 1928), American author and journalist
 James Stansfield Collier, English physician and neurologist
 James Graham Collier (1937–2011), English jazz bassist
 Jim Collier (born 1939), American football tight end
 Jimmy Collier (born 1945), American folk musician and civil rights activist
 James A. Collier, owner of the Utah Stars

See also
Rob James-Collier (born 1976), English actor